Brierley is a town in South Yorkshire, England.

Brierley  may also refer to:

Brierley, Gloucestershire, England
Brierley, Herefordshire, England
Brierley Hill, West Midlands, England

Other
Brierley (surname)

See also
 Brierly (surname)